Paul Ronzheimer (born July 26, 1985 in Aurich) is a German journalist and deputy editor-in-chief of Bild.

Life 
Ronzheimer lived in his childhood in East Frisia. He went to Gymnasium Ulricianum in Aurich. After school he worked as journalist for newspaper Emder Zeitung. Since 2008 Ronzheimer works as journalist for German newspaper Bild. In 2015 he covered the Syrian refugee crisis, live-steaming interviews as he traveled with refugees across Europe. As war correspondent he was in Ukraine, Libya, Turkey, Syria, Afghanistan and in Iraq. As an openly gay German journalist  Ronzheimer asked for the tabloid Bild Iranian politician Mohammad Javad Zarif "Why are homosexuals executed in Iran?". 

As of February/March 2022. Ronzheimer is as war correspondent in Kyiv during 2022 Russian invasion of Ukraine. In March 2022 Ronzheimer interviewed in exclusive talks Ukrainian president Volodymyr Zelenskyy and also Klitschko brothers in Kyiv.

Awards 
 2011: Herbert Quandt Medien-Preis (together with Nikolaus Blome)
 2016: Axel-Springer-Preis
 2022: Order of Merit Ukraine, 3rd class

Works

References

External links 
 Zeit.de: Ich arbeite auf der dunklen Seite, interview with Ronzheimer
 Meedia.de: Gibt BILD Vize Paul Ronzheimer endlich einen Journalistenpreis (german)
 BILD.de: Das unwürdige Schauspiel im Deutschen Bundestag (german)
 Bild.de: Das ist Paul Ronzheimer (german)
 

German war correspondents
German television reporters and correspondents
German male journalists
People from Aurich
German LGBT journalists
20th-century German journalists
21st-century German journalists
21st-century LGBT people
Living people
War correspondents of the War in Afghanistan (2001–2021)
War correspondents of the Syrian civil war
War correspondents of the Russo-Ukrainian War
Bild people
1985 births
German gay writers
Writers from Lower Saxony
German newspaper editors